Durrance Inlet is an ice-filled inlet  north of Veststraumen Glacier along the Princess Martha Coast of Antarctica. It was plotted by the United States Geological Survey from aerial photographs obtained by U.S. Navy Squadron VXE-6 in a November 5, 1967 reconnaissance flight over this coast, and was named by the Advisory Committee on Antarctic Names for Lieutenant Frank M. Durrance, Jr. of the U.S. Navy Reserve, a navigator on that flight.

References 

Inlets of Antarctica
Bodies of water of Queen Maud Land
Princess Martha Coast